Van Gendt is a Dutch toponymic surname indicating an origin in  the town Gendt, Gelderland. People with this name include:

Dirk-Jan van Gendt (born 1974), Dutch volleyball player 
 (1835–1901), Dutch architect
Twan van Gendt (born 1992), Dutch racing cyclist
Willem Eggert van Gendt (1360–1417), Amsterdam noble, banker and magistrate

See also
Van Gent, Dutch-language surname referring to Ghent
Van Gend & Loos, Dutch distribution company established by Jan-Baptist van Gend (1772–1831)
Gazette van Ghendt, 18th-century newspaper in Ghent

References

Dutch-language surnames
Toponymic surnames